The Braille pattern dots-12346 is a 6-dot braille cell with both top, both bottom, and the middle left dots raised, or an 8-dot braille cell with both top, both lower-middle, and the upper-middle left dots raised. It is represented by the Unicode code point U+282f, and in Braille ASCII with the ampersand: &.

Unified Braille

In unified international braille, the braille pattern dots-12346 is used to represent a voiceless alveolar or dental fricative, such as /s/ or /s̪/ when multiple letters correspond to these values, and is otherwise assigned as needed.

Table of unified braille values

Other braille

Plus dots 7 and 8

Related to Braille pattern dots-12346 are Braille patterns 123467, 123468, and 1234678, which are used in 8-dot braille systems, such as Gardner-Salinas and Luxembourgish Braille.

Related 8-dot kantenji patterns

In the Japanese kantenji braille, the standard 8-dot Braille patterns 23578, 123578, 234578, and 1234578 are the patterns related to Braille pattern dots-12346, since the two additional dots of kantenji patterns 012346, 123467, and 0123467 are placed above the base 6-dot cell, instead of below, as in standard 8-dot braille.

Kantenji using braille patterns 23578, 123578, 234578, or 1234578

This listing includes kantenji using Braille pattern dots-12346 for all 6349 kanji found in JIS C 6226-1978.

  - 玉

Variants and thematic compounds

  -  selector 4 + へ/⺩  =  冊
  -  selector 4 + selector 4 + へ/⺩  =  册
  -  へ/⺩ + selector 1  =  王
  -  へ/⺩ + selector 2  =  将
  -  へ/⺩ + selector 2 + selector 2  =  爿
  -  へ/⺩ + selector 3  =  主
  -  へ/⺩ + selector 5  =  片
  -  数 + へ/⺩  =  丙
  -  比 + へ/⺩  =  出

Compounds of 玉

  -  囗 + へ/⺩  =  国
  -  selector 1 + 囗 + へ/⺩  =  囗
  -  囗 + 囗 + へ/⺩  =  國
  -  し/巿 + 囗 + へ/⺩  =  幗
  -  ⺼ + 囗 + へ/⺩  =  膕
  -  て/扌 + 囗 + へ/⺩  =  掴
  -  き/木 + 囗 + へ/⺩  =  椢
  -  う/宀/#3 + へ/⺩  =  宝
  -  う/宀/#3 + う/宀/#3 + へ/⺩  =  寶
  -  selector 1 + う/宀/#3 + へ/⺩  =  寳
  -  火 + う/宀/#3 + へ/⺩  =  瑩
  -  ま/石 + へ/⺩  =  璧
  -  め/目 + へ/⺩  =  璽
  -  ち/竹 + 龸 + へ/⺩  =  筺
  -  も/門 + う/宀/#3 + へ/⺩  =  閠

Compounds of 冊 and 册

  -  仁/亻 + へ/⺩  =  偏
  -  い/糹/#2 + へ/⺩  =  編
  -  ひ/辶 + へ/⺩  =  遍
  -  へ/⺩ + 仁/亻  =  嗣
  -  ぬ/力 + 宿 + へ/⺩  =  刪
  -  と/戸 + 宿 + へ/⺩  =  扁
  -  き/木 + 宿 + へ/⺩  =  柵
  -  へ/⺩ + 宿 + へ/⺩  =  珊
  -  ち/竹 + 宿 + へ/⺩  =  篇
  -  へ/⺩ + む/車 + selector 2  =  翩
  -  む/車 + 宿 + へ/⺩  =  蝙
  -  ね/示 + 宿 + へ/⺩  =  褊
  -  え/訁 + 宿 + へ/⺩  =  諞
  -  み/耳 + 宿 + へ/⺩  =  跚
  -  そ/馬 + 宿 + へ/⺩  =  騙

Compounds of 王

  -  り/分 + へ/⺩  =  全
  -  き/木 + り/分 + へ/⺩  =  栓
  -  や/疒 + り/分 + へ/⺩  =  痊
  -  ち/竹 + り/分 + へ/⺩  =  筌
  -  か/金 + り/分 + へ/⺩  =  銓
  -  れ/口 + へ/⺩  =  呈
  -  の/禾 + へ/⺩  =  程
  -  ひ/辶 + れ/口 + へ/⺩  =  逞
  -  さ/阝 + れ/口 + へ/⺩  =  郢
  -  せ/食 + れ/口 + へ/⺩  =  酲
  -  宿 + へ/⺩  =  害
  -  め/目 + 宿 + へ/⺩  =  瞎
  -  む/車 + へ/⺩  =  轄
  -  は/辶 + へ/⺩  =  廷
  -  よ/广 + へ/⺩  =  庭
  -  て/扌 + は/辶 + へ/⺩  =  挺
  -  き/木 + は/辶 + へ/⺩  =  梃
  -  ち/竹 + は/辶 + へ/⺩  =  霆
  -  ふ/女 + へ/⺩  =  艇
  -  氷/氵 + へ/⺩  =  潤
  -  け/犬 + へ/⺩  =  狂
  -  え/訁 + け/犬 + へ/⺩  =  誑
  -  へ/⺩ + へ/⺩  =  琴
  -  日 + へ/⺩  =  皇
  -  む/車 + 日 + へ/⺩  =  凰
  -  ゆ/彳 + 日 + へ/⺩  =  徨
  -  る/忄 + 日 + へ/⺩  =  惶
  -  に/氵 + 日 + へ/⺩  =  湟
  -  火 + 日 + へ/⺩  =  煌
  -  ち/竹 + 日 + へ/⺩  =  篁
  -  ひ/辶 + 日 + へ/⺩  =  遑
  -  か/金 + 日 + へ/⺩  =  鍠
  -  さ/阝 + 日 + へ/⺩  =  隍
  -  せ/食 + 日 + へ/⺩  =  鰉
  -  え/訁 + へ/⺩  =  註
  -  も/門 + へ/⺩  =  閏
  -  へ/⺩ + と/戸  =  弄
  -  れ/口 + へ/⺩ + と/戸  =  哢
  -  へ/⺩ + 龸  =  斑
  -  へ/⺩ + は/辶  =  毒
  -  ゐ/幺 + へ/⺩ + は/辶  =  纛
  -  へ/⺩ + 宿  =  玩
  -  へ/⺩ + ろ/十  =  玲
  -  へ/⺩ + う/宀/#3  =  珍
  -  へ/⺩ + か/金  =  珠
  -  へ/⺩ + ぬ/力  =  班
  -  へ/⺩ + め/目  =  現
  -  へ/⺩ + に/氵  =  球
  -  selector 4 + へ/⺩ + に/氵  =  毬
  -  へ/⺩ + り/分  =  理
  -  へ/⺩ + く/艹  =  琉
  -  へ/⺩ + の/禾  =  瑞
  -  へ/⺩ + 心  =  瑟
  -  へ/⺩ + る/忄  =  環
  -  へ/⺩ + ま/石  =  碧
  -  へ/⺩ + ゐ/幺  =  素
  -  へ/⺩ + ね/示  =  表
  -  へ/⺩ + を/貝  =  責
  -  ぬ/力 + へ/⺩ + を/貝  =  勣
  -  れ/口 + へ/⺩ + を/貝  =  嘖
  -  ま/石 + へ/⺩ + を/貝  =  磧
  -  ち/竹 + へ/⺩ + を/貝  =  簀
  -  み/耳 + へ/⺩ + を/貝  =  蹟
  -  へ/⺩ + さ/阝  =  邦
  -  へ/⺩ + す/発  =  麦
  -  へ/⺩ + へ/⺩ + す/発  =  麥
  -  も/門 + へ/⺩ + す/発  =  麹
  -  も/門 + へ/⺩ + selector 1  =  匡
  -  ち/竹 + へ/⺩ + selector 1  =  筐
  -  て/扌 + へ/⺩ + selector 1  =  抂
  -  日 + へ/⺩ + selector 1  =  旺
  -  き/木 + へ/⺩ + selector 1  =  枉
  -  に/氵 + へ/⺩ + selector 1  =  汪
  -  へ/⺩ + す/発 + selector 4  =  玖
  -  へ/⺩ + 仁/亻 + 囗  =  玳
  -  へ/⺩ + selector 4 + ひ/辶  =  玻
  -  へ/⺩ + 日 + selector 1  =  珀
  -  へ/⺩ + 比 + か/金  =  珂
  -  へ/⺩ + ぬ/力 + れ/口  =  珈
  -  へ/⺩ + 宿 + 龸  =  珎
  -  へ/⺩ + す/発 + れ/口  =  珞
  -  へ/⺩ + 宿 + み/耳  =  珥
  -  へ/⺩ + 宿 + つ/土  =  珪
  -  へ/⺩ + む/車 + し/巿  =  珮
  -  へ/⺩ + う/宀/#3 + ふ/女  =  珱
  -  へ/⺩ + ら/月 + れ/口  =  珸
  -  へ/⺩ + 比 + や/疒  =  琅
  -  へ/⺩ + そ/馬 + selector 3  =  琢
  -  へ/⺩ + す/発 + selector 3  =  琥
  -  へ/⺩ + selector 4 + 火  =  琲
  -  へ/⺩ + き/木 + き/木  =  琳
  -  へ/⺩ + 宿 + 比  =  琵
  -  へ/⺩ + 宿 + ひ/辶  =  琶
  -  へ/⺩ + に/氵 + こ/子  =  琺
  -  へ/⺩ + 宿 + む/車  =  琿
  -  へ/⺩ + 日 + め/目  =  瑁
  -  へ/⺩ + 宿 + の/禾  =  瑕
  -  へ/⺩ + 宿 + ち/竹  =  瑙
  -  へ/⺩ + 宿 + ら/月  =  瑚
  -  へ/⺩ + く/艹 + お/頁  =  瑛
  -  へ/⺩ + selector 5 + ゆ/彳  =  瑜
  -  へ/⺩ + ら/月 + た/⽥  =  瑠
  -  へ/⺩ + 宿 + を/貝  =  瑣
  -  へ/⺩ + 宿 + そ/馬  =  瑪
  -  へ/⺩ + や/疒 + さ/阝  =  瑯
  -  へ/⺩ + お/頁 + に/氵  =  瑰
  -  へ/⺩ + そ/馬 + こ/子  =  瑳
  -  へ/⺩ + 宿 + か/金  =  瑶
  -  へ/⺩ + 宿 + き/木  =  瑾
  -  へ/⺩ + selector 4 + い/糹/#2  =  璃
  -  へ/⺩ + ま/石 + ろ/十  =  璋
  -  へ/⺩ + 宿 + な/亻  =  璞
  -  へ/⺩ + 宿 + た/⽥  =  璢
  -  へ/⺩ + お/頁 + す/発  =  瓊
  -  へ/⺩ + ま/石 + 心  =  瓏
  -  へ/⺩ + ふ/女 + を/貝  =  瓔
  -  む/車 + 龸 + へ/⺩  =  蝗

Compounds of 将 and 爿

  -  へ/⺩ + へ/⺩ + selector 2  =  將
  -  に/氵 + へ/⺩ + selector 2  =  漿
  -  か/金 + へ/⺩ + selector 2  =  鏘
  -  つ/土 + へ/⺩  =  埒
  -  つ/土 + つ/土 + へ/⺩  =  埓
  -  へ/⺩ + つ/土  =  壮
  -  く/艹 + へ/⺩  =  荘
  -  く/艹 + く/艹 + へ/⺩  =  莊
  -  へ/⺩ + へ/⺩ + つ/土  =  壯
  -  け/犬 + へ/⺩ + つ/土  =  奘
  -  と/戸 + へ/⺩ + つ/土  =  弉
  -  へ/⺩ + 比  =  奨
  -  へ/⺩ + へ/⺩ + 比  =  奬
  -  selector 4 + へ/⺩ + 比  =  獎
  -  へ/⺩ + 囗  =  牆
  -  へ/⺩ + け/犬  =  状
  -  心 + へ/⺩ + selector 2  =  蒋
  -  せ/食 + へ/⺩ + selector 2  =  醤
  -  へ/⺩ + 宿 + ふ/女  =  妝
  -  へ/⺩ + 宿 + す/発  =  臧

Compounds of 主

  -  な/亻 + へ/⺩  =  住
  -  ゆ/彳 + へ/⺩  =  往
  -  き/木 + へ/⺩  =  柱
  -  に/氵 + へ/⺩  =  注
  -  み/耳 + へ/⺩  =  聖
  -  む/車 + み/耳 + へ/⺩  =  蟶
  -  そ/馬 + へ/⺩  =  駐
  -  へ/⺩ + そ/馬 + 比  =  麈

Compounds of 片

  -  へ/⺩ + ん/止  =  版
  -  へ/⺩ + た/⽥  =  牌
  -  へ/⺩ + 宿 + 囗  =  牋
  -  へ/⺩ + 宿 + よ/广  =  牒
  -  へ/⺩ + つ/土 + を/貝  =  牘

Compounds of 丙

  -  火 + 数 + へ/⺩  =  炳
  -  さ/阝 + 数 + へ/⺩  =  陋
  -  と/戸 + 数 + へ/⺩  =  鞆

Compounds of 出

  -  と/戸 + へ/⺩  =  屈
  -  な/亻 + と/戸 + へ/⺩  =  倔
  -  や/疒 + と/戸 + へ/⺩  =  崛
  -  う/宀/#3 + と/戸 + へ/⺩  =  窟
  -  て/扌 + へ/⺩  =  拙
  -  れ/口 + 比 + へ/⺩  =  咄
  -  ら/月 + 比 + へ/⺩  =  朏
  -  き/木 + 比 + へ/⺩  =  柮
  -  ね/示 + 比 + へ/⺩  =  祟
  -  の/禾 + 比 + へ/⺩  =  糶
  -  し/巿 + 比 + へ/⺩  =  黜

Other compounds

  -  へ/⺩ + し/巿  =  寿
  -  へ/⺩ + へ/⺩ + し/巿  =  壽
  -  な/亻 + へ/⺩ + し/巿  =  儔
  -  へ/⺩ + へ/⺩ + し/巿  =  壽
  -  て/扌 + へ/⺩ + し/巿  =  擣
  -  氷/氵 + へ/⺩ + し/巿  =  濤
  -  た/⽥ + へ/⺩ + し/巿  =  疇
  -  た/⽥ + 宿 + へ/⺩  =  畴
  -  ち/竹 + へ/⺩ + し/巿  =  籌
  -  み/耳 + へ/⺩ + し/巿  =  躊
  -  ね/示 + へ/⺩  =  祷
  -  き/木 + へ/⺩ + し/巿  =  梼
  -  き/木 + 龸 + へ/⺩  =  檮
  -  に/氵 + へ/⺩ + し/巿  =  涛
  -  さ/阝 + へ/⺩ + し/巿  =  陦
  -  へ/⺩ + ゑ/訁  =  収
  -  へ/⺩ + へ/⺩ + ゑ/訁  =  收
  -  へ/⺩ + き/木  =  妃
  -  つ/土 + 宿 + へ/⺩  =  塀

Notes

Braille patterns